Leucostethus brachistriatus is a species of frog in the family Dendrobatidae. It is endemic to Colombia and occurs on the western slopes of Cordillera Central and on Cordillera Occidental. Common name stripe-throated rocket frog has been proposed for it.

Description
The tympanum is relatively large but partly concealed and not very conspicuous. The fingers have neither webbing nor lateral fringes. Basal webbing is present between the toes II–V. The dorsum is cream-colored. An oblique lateral band runs from the eye to the groin.

Habitat and conservation
Leucostethus brachistriatus is a terrestrial frog found near streams in sub-Andean forests. It is common where forested habitat remains, but it is a very adaptable species that is also found in cropland and cow pastures. The eggs are deposited in leaf litter. The tadpoles are then carried to streams where they continue their development.

This species is not substantially threatened, although it can suffer from the forest loss that is occurring throughout its range. It is present in the Ucumari regional reserve and in the Barbas-Bremen Ecological Corridor.

References

brachistriatus
Frogs of South America
Amphibians of the Andes
Amphibians of Colombia
Taxa named by Juan A. Rivero
Taxa named by Marco Antonio Serna Díaz
Amphibians described in 1986
Taxonomy articles created by Polbot